The Harmony Geneva Marathon for UNICEF is an annual marathon running event held in Geneva, Switzerland. It draws about 9,100 participants every May. Apart from the marathon, there is also a half marathon, a Relay Marathon, a 20 km Handbike and wheelchair race, a 10 km race held on the same day, and races exclusively for women (5 km) and children (1 to 5 km) held the day before. A time limit of six hours and a half applies to the main event.

The 2020 edition of the race was cancelled due to the coronavirus pandemic, with all registrants given the option of transferring their entry to 2021 or obtaining a partial refund.

Winners 
Key:

Multiple wins

By country

Notes

References

External links 
 Geneva Marathon
 Marathon Info

Recurring sporting events established in 2005
Marathons in Switzerland
Marathon
Annual sporting events in Switzerland
Spring (season) events in Switzerland